B. Mutlu Sumer (born 15 November 1945) is a Turkish scientist and engineer known for his studies on seabed and structure interaction including scour and soil liquefaction, as well as turbulence in coastal and civil engineering. He was previously Professor at the Technical University of Denmark (Department of Mechanical Engineering, Section for Fluid Mechanics, Coastal and Maritime Engineering) until he retired in 2015. He held a Professor-Emeritus position between June 2015 and June 2017 at the same university. He was Professor of Hydraulics at Istanbul Technical University before he moved to Denmark in 1984. B. Mutlu Sumer relocated to Turkey, his native country, in 2016 and founded a consultancy and research company, BM SUMER Consultancy & Research, affiliated with Istanbul Technical University.

Education 
He graduated with MSc (1967) and PhD (1970) from Istanbul Technical University. He was a post-doctoral research fellow at University of Cambridge, UK (1971-1973).

Research 
His main fields of research are flow around marine structures –scour, liquefaction, hydrodynamic forces, and hydroelastic vibrations– and turbulence and sediment transport.

Academic life 
He has coordinated SCARCOST (Scour Around Coastal Structures) (1997-2000) and LIMAS (Liquefaction Around Marine Structures) (2001-2004), two European research programmes financed by the European Community under MAST III, and FP5 programmes, respectively. He has also coordinated EPCOAST (Exploitation and Protection of Coastal Zones), a frame research program financed by Danish Technical Research Council (2005-2008); and Seabed Wind Farm Interaction, another frame research program financed by Danish Council for Strategic Research (DSF)/Energy and Environment (2008-2012). Further to his role as coordinators of the aforementioned research programmes, he has also participated in many international (EU) and national (Danish) research programmes.

During his tenure at Technical University of Denmark (1984-2015), B. Mutlu Sumer developed courses such as Marine Structures I (forces on and vibrations of marine structures such as marine pipelines), Marine Structures II (scour around marine structures, and wave-induced liquefaction of marine soils and its impact on marine structures), and Turbulence Theory, among others, supported by his books on these subjects. He supervised 22 Ph.D. students, 69 Master's students, and 22 visiting research associates/postdocs.

He delivered many keynote addresses and invited lectures in scientific meetings, and gave lectures and seminars at universities and other academic institutions in different countries, and published over 200 scientific papers.

Awards and recognition 
His awards include:
 Certificate of Appreciation by the Board of Governors of the Coasts, Oceans, Ports and Rivers Institute, American Society of Civil Engineering, in Recognition of Dedication and Service as an Associate Editor of the Journal of Waterway, Port, Ocean and Coastal Engineering (2001-2018),
 ICCE 2016 Award. In recognition of contribution and dedication to Coastal Engineering and commitment to excellence, on the occasion of the 35th International Conference on Coastal Engineering (ICCE 2016),
 2005 Karl Emil Hilgard Hydraulic Prize of American Society of Civil Engineers
 1991 Science Award, Scientific and Technical Research Council of Turkey (TUBITAK)

Books 

 Hydrodynamics Around Cylindrical Structures
 The Mechanics of Scour in the Marine Environment
 Liquefaction Around Marine Structures
 Turbulence in Coastal and Civil Engineering

References 

1945 births
Living people
Istanbul Technical University alumni
Academic staff of Istanbul Technical University
Academic staff of the Technical University of Denmark
Turkish scientists